The men's 100 kg competition of the judo events at the 2019 Pan American Games in Lima, Peru, was held on August 11 at the Polideportivo 3.

Results 
All times are local (UTC−5)

Bracket

Repechage round
Two bronze medals were awarded.

References

External links
Draw Sheet (with results)

M100
Judo at the Pan American Games Men's Half Heavyweight